Congolese or Kongolese may refer to:

African peoples
 Congolese people (disambiguation)
 Kongo people, a Bantu ethnic group who live along the Atlantic coast of Africa from Pointe-Noire (Republic of Congo) to Luanda, Angola, primarily defined by speaking of the common language Kikongo
 Kongo language, the Bantu language spoken by the Bakongo and Bandundu people living in the Democratic Republic of the Congo, the Republic of the Congo and Angola
 Democratic Republic of the Congo cuisine, food of indigenous people, cassava the staple

African countries
 Something of, from, or related to the Republic of the Congo (Brazzaville), in Africa, located west of the Congo River
 Something of, from, or related to the Democratic Republic of the Congo, in Africa, through which the Congo River flows
 Something of, from, or related to the former French Congo, in Africa, the modern-day Republic of the Congo
 Something of, from, or related to the former Republic of the Congo, in Africa, the modern-day Democratic Republic
 Something of, from, or related to the former Belgian Congo, in Africa, the predecessor of the Republic of the Congo (Léopoldville)
 Something of, from, or related to the former Congo Free State, in Africa, the predecessor of the Belgian Congo

See also
 Congolese Americans
 Languages of the Republic of the Congo
 Languages of the Democratic Republic of the Congo, a multilingual country where an estimated total of 242 languages are spoken
 Congolese Civil War (disambiguation)
 
 
 Congo (disambiguation)
 Congolese National Movement-Lumumba
 Congolese music (disambiguation)

Language and nationality disambiguation pages
Demonyms